La ley del silencio is an American telenovela produced by Telemundo in 2003.

Cast 

 José Ángel Llamas - Padre Javier Castro 
 Flora Martínez - Natalia Aguirre
 Rodrigo de la Rosa - Fernando Cardenas 
 Jullye Giliberti - Magdalena Aguirre 
 Alejandro Chabán - Tomás 
 Joaquín Garrido - Pedro 
 Lumi Cavazos - Clemencia 
 Omar Fierro - Francisco 
 Issabella Camil - Julia 
 Fernanda Romero - Virginia
 Lilian Tapia - Guadalupe 
 Henry Zakka - Luis Alberto 
 Julio Bracho Castillo - Ángel 
 Liz Gallardo - Manuela 
 Chela Arias - Clotilde 
 Mónica Lopera - Adela 
 José Bardina - Arturo
 Eliana H. Alexander - Amparo
 Sergio Romero - Sebastián
 Cora Cardona - Mercedes
 Mara Croatto - Isabel
 Roger Cudney - Meyer
 Juan Pablo Gamboa - Leopoldo
 Marlon Lara - Jimmy
 Mauricio Ripke - Sata
 Leticia Alaniz - Laura / Recepcionista
 Joe Arquette - Topo
 Ricardo Azulay - Dr. Clark
 Glenn Bradley - Miembro de banda
 Dan Burkarth - Policia & Chofer
 Javier Castillo - Jerry García
 Édgar Castuera - Bombero
 Gerardo Dávila - Manager de restaurante
 Gigi Erneta - Jane
 Carlos Girón - Ramiro
 Rodrigo Gómez - Poncho
 Julián Guevara - Sweety
 Tony Helling - Paulina
 Andrea León - Apache
 John Nikitin - Agente Counts
 Mónica Peña - Enfermera Svenson
 J.R. Ramírez - Mr. A
 Raymond Rivera - Travolta
 Germán Santiago - Tomás
 Mark-Brian Sonna - Dr. José Luis Monsalve
 Craig Taylor - Patrón
 Carolina Vengoechea - Jennifer González
 Ted West - Basura

References 

Telemundo telenovelas
2005 telenovelas